Hart Hill may refer to the following hills or places in the United Kingdom:

 Hart Hill, Luton, an inner city district of Luton, Bedfordshire, England
 Hart Hill (Stirling) (437 m), a hill in Stirling, Scotland
 Hart Hill (Moray) (276 m), a hill in Moray, Scotland
 Hart Hill (Glos) (263 m), a hill in Gloucestershire, England
 Hart Hill (Cheshire), a hill in the Delamere Forest, Cheshire, England

 Hart Hill, Kent, a Site of Special Scientific Interest in Kent, England

See also 
 Hart Hills, Antarctica
 Harthill (disambiguation)